Carmen Beato (born May 20 1968) is a Mexican actress knows for her telenovelas of TV Azteca and Telemundo.

Career 
She was educated and graduated from the Centro Universitario de Teatro (CUT) of the UNAM. Among the awards she has received during her career are an Ariel for Best Actress for her performance in the film "En la mente del asesino", Best Actress in the film "La vida Inmune", awarded by the Accredited Journalists at the XXI Guadalajara International Film Festival, 2006; Pantalla de Cristal award for Best Actress for her performance in the film "El principio de la Espiral", Salvador Novo award in the category of Female Revelation in Theater for her performance in the play "Hace Tiempo". She was nominated for an Ariel Award for Best Female Co-Actress in the film "Los Parecidos", and nominated for a Silver Goddess Award for Best Actress in the film "Aquí entre nos".

Her other film work includes "La Atlántida" by Bárbara Ochoa, "Somos lo que hay", directed by Jorge Michel Grau (selected in Cannes for the Directors' Fortnight), "Te extraño" by Fabián Hofman, "Entre la noche y el día" by Bernardo Arellano, "Noches de Julio" by Axel Muñoz, among others. In television works include "Demencia", "El César", "Sincronía", "La taxista", "Guerra de ídolos", "Prisionero número uno", "Todo por amor", "Amores", "El país de las mujeres", "Mientras haya vida", "Contrato de amor", "Cielo Rojo", "La otra cara del alma", "Corazón en condominio", among others.

In 2015 she participated in the film Ladrones with Fernando Colunga, Eduardo Yáñez and Vadhir Derbez.

In addition to film and television, Beato has participated in more than ten plays working with directors such as Luis de Tavira, José Caballero, Héctor Mendoza, Alberto Lomnitz, Mario Espinosa.

Filmography

Telenovelas

Films
 1992 Mi querido Tom Mix
 2000 Antes que anochezca
 2002 Aro Tolbukhin En la mente del asesino
 2006 Un mundo maravilloso
 2008 High School Musical: El desafío (Mexican Film) – Angela
 2010 We are What We are
 2011 Bacalar
 2011 Aquí entre nos
 2012 Después de Lucía
 2015 The Similars
 2015 Ladrones – Josefa Ramirez
 2016 7:19

References

External links 
 

Living people
Mexican telenovela actresses
Mexican television actresses
Mexican film actresses
Mexican women television presenters
1968 births